The earless dwarf skink  (Nannoscincus mariei) is a species of skink found in New Caledonia.

References

Nannoscincus
Reptiles described in 1869
Skinks of New Caledonia
Endemic fauna of New Caledonia
Taxa named by Arthur René Jean Baptiste Bavay